Jungk Hill is a mostly ice-free hill  northeast of Mount Aurora on Black Island, in the Ross Archipelago of Antarctica. It was named after Robert A. Jungk of Antarctic Support Associates (ASA) who engaged in development and expansion of Black Island communication systems for several years beginning in 1989, and was ASA project engineer for the United States Antarctic Program Unattended Satellite Earth Station which became operational in 1995.

References

External links

Hills of the Ross Dependency
Black Island (Ross Archipelago)